Gary Worthington (born 10 November 1966) is an English former professional footballer who played as a striker. Active in the Football League between 1984 and 1994, Worthington made nearly 200 career appearances, scoring over 50 goals. After retiring as a player, Worthington became a football coach and scout, and is currently Head of Player Recruitment at Manchester City.

Early and personal life
Born in Cleethorpes, Worthington is the son of former professional footballer Dave Worthington. His uncles Bob and Frank were also professional footballers.

Career

Playing career
Worthington was a youth player with Manchester United, but did not make any first-team appearances before moving to Huddersfield Town. He also played in the Football League for Darlington, Wrexham, Wigan Athletic, Exeter City and Doncaster Rovers. He later played non-League football with Halifax Town.

Coaching and scouting career
After retiring as a player, Worthington worked in youth development with the Academies of Leeds United and Chelsea, before being appointed Assistant Head of Player Recruitment at Manchester City in June 2010.

References

1966 births
Living people
English footballers
Manchester United F.C. players
Huddersfield Town A.F.C. players
Darlington F.C. players
Wrexham A.F.C. players
Wigan Athletic F.C. players
Exeter City F.C. players
Doncaster Rovers F.C. players
Halifax Town A.F.C. players
English Football League players
Manchester City F.C. non-playing staff
Association football forwards
People from Cleethorpes